Amr Kaddoura (born 1 July 1994) is a footballer who plays as a goalkeeper for Swedish Superettan club Landskrona BoIS. Born in Sweden, he plays for the Palestine national team.

International career
Born in Sweden, Kaddoura represents Palestine at international level. He was included in the national team for the 2019 AFC Asian Cup. He made his international debut on 1 December 2021 in a 4–0 FIFA Arab Cup defeat against Morocco.

Career statistics

International

References

External links
 
 

1994 births
Living people
Association football goalkeepers
Citizens of the State of Palestine through descent
Palestinian footballers
Palestine international footballers
Swedish footballers
Swedish people of Palestinian descent
Superettan players
Landskrona BoIS players
2019 AFC Asian Cup players
People from Landskrona Municipality
Footballers from Skåne County